"Boris, you are wrong" is a political catchphrase, originally said by Yegor Ligachev to Boris Yeltsin on 1 July 1988 to tackle Yeltsin's split from Soviet politics.

Origins 
Ligachev was at the time a member of the Politburo, while Yeltsin was First Deputy Chairman of the Soviet State Committee for Construction. Speaking at the 19th All-Union Conference of the CPSU, Ligachev said:

The form "Boris, you are wrong" was popularized by Gennady Khazanov.

The phrase did not appear in the published protocol of the conference, but within days after that event people in Moscow started to wear lapel buttons saying, "Yegor, you are wrong!" as well as posters and badges that said "Boris, you are right." The phrase has been used in later Russian publications to admonish or rebuke the opposing side in the form "N, you are wrong". Following Yeltsin's death in 2007, Ligachev upheld his criticism by saying that what he told Yeltsin back then was right in his opinion. Ligachev's own 2012 memoir book is titled Boris Was Wrong.

References

1988 in the Soviet Union
Boris Yeltsin
Russian political phrases
Soviet internal politics
1988 neologisms